Piz da l'Acqua is a mountain of the Livigno Alps, located on the border between Italy and Switzerland. The northern side of the mountain (Graubünden) is part of the Swiss National Park. The southern side of the mountain (Lombardy) is part of the Stelvio National Park. The mountain overlooks the Lago di Livigno on its eastern side.

References

External links
 Piz da l'Acqua on Hikr

Acqua
Acqua
Acqua
Italy–Switzerland border
International mountains of Europe
Acqua
Mountains of Switzerland
Zernez